In traditional logic, a contradiction occurs when a proposition conflicts either with itself or established fact. It is often used as a tool to detect disingenuous beliefs and bias. Illustrating a general tendency in applied logic, Aristotle's law of noncontradiction states that "It is impossible that the same thing can at the same time both belong and not belong to the same object and in the same respect."

In modern formal logic and type theory, the term is mainly used instead for a single proposition, often denoted by the falsum symbol ; a proposition is a contradiction if false can be derived from it, using the rules of the logic. It is a proposition that is unconditionally false (i.e., a self-contradictory proposition). This can be generalized to a collection of propositions, which is then said to "contain" a contradiction.

History
By creation of a paradox, Plato's Euthydemus dialogue demonstrates the need for the notion of contradiction. In the ensuing dialogue, Dionysodorus denies the existence of "contradiction", all the while that Socrates is contradicting him:

Indeed, Dionysodorus agrees that "there is no such thing as false opinion ... there is no such thing as ignorance", and demands of Socrates to "Refute me." Socrates responds "But how can I refute you, if, as you say, to tell a falsehood is impossible?".

In formal logic 

In classical logic, particularly in propositional and first-order logic, a proposition  is a contradiction if and only if . Since for contradictory  it is true that  for all  (because ), one may prove any proposition from a set of axioms which contains contradictions. This is called the "principle of explosion", or "ex falso quodlibet" ("from falsity, anything follows").

In a complete logic, a formula is contradictory if and only if it is unsatisfiable.

Proof by contradiction

For a set of consistent premises  and a proposition , it is true in classical logic that  (i.e.,  proves ) if and only if  (i.e.,  and  leads to a contradiction). Therefore, a proof that  also proves that  is true under the premises . The use of this fact forms the basis of a proof technique called proof by contradiction, which mathematicians use extensively to establish the validity of a wide range of theorems. This applies only in a logic where the law of excluded middle  is accepted as an axiom.

Using minimal logic, a logic with similar axioms to classical logic but without ex falso quodlibet and proof by contradiction, we can investigate the axiomatic strength and properties of various rules that treat contradiction by considering theorems of classical logic that are not theorems of minimal logic. Each of these extensions leads to an intermediate logic:
 Double-negation elimination (DNE) is the strongest principle, axiomatized , and when it is added to minimal logic yields classical logic.
 Ex falso quodlibet (EFQ), axiomatized , licenses many consequences of negations, but typically does not help to infer propositions that do not involve absurdity from consistent propositions that do. When added to minimal logic, EFQ yields intuitionistic logic. EFQ is equivalent to ex contradiction quodlibet, axiomatized , over minimal logic.
 Peirce's rule (PR) is an axiom  that captures proof by contradiction without explicitly referring to absurdity. Minimal logic + PR + EFQ yields classical logic. 
 The Gödel-Dummett (GD) axiom , whose most simple reading is that there is a linear order on truth values.  Minimal logic + GD yields Gödel-Dummett logic. Peirce's rule entails but is not entailed by GD over minimal logic.
 Law of the excluded middle (LEM), axiomatised , is the most often cited formulation of the principle of bivalence, but in the absence of EFQ it does not yield full classical logic. Minimal logic + LEM + EFQ yields classical logic. PR entails but is not entailed by LEM in minimal logic. If the formula B in Peirce's rule is restricted to absurdity, giving the axiom schema , the scheme is equivalent to LEM over minimal logic.
 Weak law of the excluded middle (WLEM) is axiomatised  and yields a system where disjunction behaves more like in classical logic than intuitionistic logic, i.e. the disjunction and existence properties don't hold, but where use of non-intuitionistic reasoning is marked by occurrences of double-negation in the conclusion. LEM entails but is not entailed by WLEM in minimal logic. WLEM is equivalent to the instance of De Morgan's law that distributes negation over conjunction: .

Symbolic representation
In mathematics, the symbol used to represent a contradiction within a proof varies. Some symbols that may be used to represent a contradiction include ↯, Opq, ⊥, / , and ※; in any symbolism, a contradiction may be substituted for the truth value "false", as symbolized, for instance, by "0" (as is common in boolean algebra). It is not uncommon to see Q.E.D., or some of its variants, immediately after a contradiction symbol. In fact, this often occurs in a proof by contradiction to indicate that the original assumption was proved false—and hence that its negation must be true.

The notion of contradiction in an axiomatic system and a proof of its consistency 
In general, a consistency proof requires the following two things:

 An axiomatic system
 A demonstration that it is not the case that both the formula p and its negation ~p can be derived in the system.

But by whatever method one goes about it, all consistency proofs would seem to necessitate the primitive notion of contradiction. Moreover, it seems as if this notion would simultaneously have to be "outside" the formal system in the definition of tautology.

When Emil Post, in his 1921 "Introduction to a General Theory of Elementary Propositions", extended his proof of the consistency of the propositional calculus (i.e. the logic) beyond that of Principia Mathematica (PM), he observed that with respect to a generalized set of postulates (i.e. axioms), he would no longer be able to automatically invoke the notion of "contradiction"such a notion might not be contained in the postulates:

Post's solution to the problem is described in the demonstration "An Example of a Successful Absolute Proof of Consistency", offered by Ernest Nagel and James R. Newman in their 1958 Gödel's Proof. They too observed a problem with respect to the notion of "contradiction" with its usual "truth values" of "truth" and "falsity". They observed that:

Given some "primitive formulas" such as PM's primitives S1 V S2 [inclusive OR] and ~S (negation), one is forced to define the axioms in terms of these primitive notions. In a thorough manner, Post demonstrates in PM, and defines (as do Nagel and Newman, see below) that the property of tautologous – as yet to be defined – is "inherited": if one begins with a set of tautologous axioms (postulates) and a deduction system that contains substitution and modus ponens, then a consistent system will yield only tautologous formulas.

On the topic of the definition of tautologous, Nagel and Newman create two mutually exclusive and exhaustive classes K1 and K2, into which fall (the outcome of) the axioms when their variables (e.g. S1 and S2 are assigned from these classes). This also applies to the primitive formulas. For example: "A formula having the form S1 V S2 is placed into class K2, if both S1 and S2 are in K2; otherwise it is placed in K1", and "A formula having the form ~S is placed in K2, if S is in K1; otherwise it is placed in K1".

Hence Nagel and Newman can now define the notion of tautologous: "a formula is a tautology if and only if it falls in the class K1, no matter in which of the two classes its elements are placed". This way, the property of "being tautologous" is described—without reference to a model or an interpretation.

Post observed that, if the system were inconsistent, a deduction in it (that is, the last formula in a sequence of formulas derived from the tautologies) could ultimately yield S itself. As an assignment to variable S can come from either class K1 or K2, the deduction violates the inheritance characteristic of tautology (i.e., the derivation must yield an evaluation of a formula that will fall into class K1). From this, Post was able to derive the following definition of inconsistency—without the use of the notion of contradiction:

In other words, the notion of "contradiction" can be dispensed when constructing a proof of consistency; what replaces it is the notion of "mutually exclusive and exhaustive" classes. An axiomatic system need not include the notion of "contradiction".

Philosophy 
Adherents of the epistemological theory of coherentism typically claim that as a necessary condition of the justification of a belief, that belief must form a part of a logically non-contradictory system of beliefs.  Some dialetheists, including Graham Priest, have argued that coherence may not require consistency.

Pragmatic contradictions
A pragmatic contradiction occurs when the very statement of the argument contradicts the claims it purports.  An inconsistency arises, in this case, because the act of utterance, rather than the content of what is said, undermines its conclusion.

Dialectical materialism

In dialectical materialism:  Contradiction—as derived from Hegelianism—usually refers to an opposition inherently existing within one realm, one unified force or object. This contradiction, as opposed to metaphysical thinking, is not an objectively impossible thing, because these contradicting forces exist in objective reality, not cancelling each other out, but actually defining each other's existence. According to Marxist theory, such a contradiction can be found, for example, in the fact that:

 (a) enormous wealth and productive powers coexist alongside:
 (b) extreme poverty and misery;
 (c) the existence of (a) being contrary to the existence of (b).
Hegelian and Marxist theory stipulates that the dialectic nature of history will lead to the sublation, or synthesis, of its contradictions. Marx therefore postulated that history would logically make capitalism evolve into a socialist society where the means of production would equally serve the exploited and suffering class of society, thus resolving the prior contradiction between (a) and (b).

Outside formal logic
Colloquial usage can label actions or statements as contradicting each other when due (or perceived as due) to presuppositions which are contradictory in the logical sense.

Proof by contradiction is used in mathematics to construct proofs.

The scientific method uses contradiction to falsify bad theory.

See also
 , a Monty Python sketch in which one of the two disputants repeatedly uses only contradictions in his argument
   
   
 
   
 
 Graham's hierarchy of disagreement  
   
 Law of noncontradiction

Notes and references

Bibliography
 Józef Maria Bocheński 1960 Précis of Mathematical Logic, translated from the French and German editions by Otto Bird, D. Reidel, Dordrecht, South Holland.
 Jean van Heijenoort 1967 From Frege to Gödel: A Source Book in Mathematical Logic 1879-1931, Harvard University Press, Cambridge, MA,  (pbk.)
Ernest Nagel and James R. Newman 1958 Gödel's Proof, New York University Press, Card Catalog Number: 58-5610.

External links

 
 
 

Propositional calculus
Marxist theory
Mathematical logic
Sentences by type
Propositions
Immediate inference
Cognitive dissonance